Mithun Sharma (born 11 January 1985), also known as Mithoon, is an Indian Hindi film music director, lyricist-composer and singer.

Mithoon composed the Hindi song "Tum Hi Ho" from the 2013 Bollywood romantic film Aashiqui 2. Mithoon received the Filmfare Award for Best Music Director, and in 2014 received a nomination for Filmfare Award for Best Lyricist in the 59th Filmfare Awards. He wrote and composed one of the most streamed Hindi songs on YouTube, "Sanam Re". The song was honoured with the award of "Most Streamed Song of 2016" at the Global Indian Music Academy Awards.

Early life 

Mithoon was born into a family of musicians. His grandfather, Pandit Ram Prasad Sharma, imparted music knowledge to thousands of aspirants, many of whom are amongst today's top musicians. His father, Naresh Sharma, was a leading expert of musical arrangements, having worked with almost all of the top composers in more than two hundred movies. Mithoon's father and his uncle Pyarelal-ji (Pyarelal Ramprasad Sharma) formed one-half of the legendary composer duo Laxmikant-Pyarelal.

Mithoon started learning music at the age of eleven. Since his father remained busy, he sent him to knowledgeable people to train himself. His father observed him closely and would often notice what he was practicing. His father often listened to the tunes that he created as well. On 6 November 2022, he married playback singer Palak Muchhal.

Career

Mithoon began his career with two recreations: "Woh Lamhe" in Zeher and "Aadat" in Kalyug. In 2006, Mithoon's friend recommended his name to Onir, (director of Bas Ek Pal), who wanted an electro-based title track. This led to his first original song as a composer, "Bas Ek Pal" with singer KK, and was followed by "Tere Bin" (by singer Atif Aslam) in 2006. Both songs were included in the film Bas Ek Pal. .

He wrote the score for Anwar, released in 2007 and his compositions Tose Naina Lage and Maula Mere are still extremely popular.

He also worked as a guest composer for songs on several nonmovie albums, such as "Kuch Is Tarah" from Atif Aslam's album Doorie, and Abhijeet Sawant's and "Ek Shaqs" from the Abhijeet Sawant album Junoon. He released his own album, Tu Hi Mere Rab Ki Tarah Hai in 2009 with T-Series. For this album, Mithoon traveled to the United Kingdom to rope in musicians. There, he worked with musicians of the Philharmonic Orchestra.

In 2011 he composed two songs "Aye Khuda", "Phir Mohabbat" for the film Murder 2  which also marked the debut of Arijit Singh.

The song "Tum Hi Ho" which he wrote for Aashiqui 2, and "O saathi" from the movie Shab became popular.

Bollywood discography

Albums

Singles

Awards and nominations 
List of awards and nominations received by Mithoon

Asiavision Awards

BIG Star Entertainment Awards

Filmfare Awards

Global Indian Music Academy Awards

International Indian Film Academy Awards

Mirchi Music Awards

Producers Guild Film Awards

Screen Awards

Stardust Awards

Zee Cine Awards 

 Gaana User's Choice Awards – Best Music Composer (for "Phir Bhi Tumko Chaahunga") – Won
 Bollywood Journalist Awards – Best Music Director (for "Phir Bhi Tumko Chaahunga") – Nominated

References

External links
 
 
 
 

1985 births
Living people
Indian male playback singers
Indian film score composers
Filmfare Awards winners
Musicians from Mumbai
Indian male film score composers